Rohon–Beard cells are specialized neurons with mechanoreceptive properties. They occur during the embryonic stage of development and are found in the dorsal part of the spinal cord in fish and amphibians.

Rohon–Beard neurons develop on the border between the ectoderm epidermal (surface) and neuroectoderm, first in the order of receptor neurons.

In most species Rohon–Beard cells disappear during the course of ontogenetic development (e.g. in zebrafish during the first two to four weeks of development, at the late larval, early juvenile stage to be, replaced by a dorsal root ganglion of spinal nerves) by apoptosis.

John Beard and Joseph Victor Rohon first described these cells, independently of each other.

See also
 Neural crest

References

Neurons